Stephen Spurr (born 9 October, 1953) is an independent consultant and expert in UK and international education. From 2014 to August 2019, he was the Global Education Director of Inspired, an international education network of over 60 premium K-12 schools on five continents. A British teacher, classicist, and academic, from 2005 to 2014 he was the Head Master of Westminster School.

Prior to that he was headmaster of Clifton College (2000-2005) and House Master and Head of Classics at Eton College (1984-2000). Before Eton he was a university academic, lecturing on Greek and Roman literature, history and archaeology.

Education
Spurr was educated at The King's School, Canterbury and Sydney Grammar School. He studied classics at the Universities of Sydney and Oxford, culminating in a DPhil degree in Ancient History from Oxford. He was awarded a postgraduate Fellowship at Harvard University, the Ancient History Prize and Cooper and Pelham Scholarships at Oxford, and a Rome Scholarship at the British School at Rome.

Views
In 2004 Spurr stated that A-level exams may fail talented pupils, especially in the Humanities; and Westminster consequently switched to Cambridge Pre-U exams in 9 subjects, which he described as "so much more stimulating to teach and learn" and much better preparation for study at university. He has also always been a great proponent of scientific education.  In another two subjects, his Westminster pupils followed International A-levels, which, together with the Pre-Us, enable comparison with the best schools world-wide, since Spurr aims to educate pupils not only for a successful entrance to top ranked universities but also to become engaged global citizens of the future. While working for Inspired, he also came to appreciate the value of the IB curriculum. From 2006 to 2013 Spurr was the Chairman of ISEB, the board that produces and regulates the Common Entrance examination, with emphasis on breadth of knowledge, academic integrity, and rigour. According to Tatler magazine, Spurr also believes in academic research for its own intrinsic sake.

At Eton, Clifton and Westminster, he consistently looked to identify and encourage academically ambitious pupils in the state sector, through extensive fund-raising for bursary programs and by establishing the Eton-Harlesden Summer School in 1986, the Clifton Summer School in 2001 and, in his last year as head master at Westminster, he set up the Harris-Westminster Sixth Form Academy, a joint project between Westminster School and the Harris Federation, which opened in 2014 and was judged Outstanding in its first Inspection by Ofsted.

He has always considered that British education needs to take careful notice of the best international standards. This is a theme on which he has given talks in the UK, Italy, Singapore, the US and China - where he linked Westminster school with Beijing No 4, one of the top academic schools in Beijing. Developing his belief in the growing importance of international education, on leaving Westminster he joined Inspired as Group Education Director in September 2014 helping the company to grow successfully from its original base of 4 schools in South Africa to (when he retired from Inspired to set up his own consultancy in August 2019) 64 schools and 46,000 students on five continents. He is a governor of the Royal Ballet School and of Tonbridge School. As an independent educational consultant, he speaks and advises regularly on the future of education, combining the best of traditional British pedagogy with the highest international standards and the latest advances in digital learning.

Personal life
In 1982 Spurr married Susanna Armani in Rome and they have a son and a daughter.

Scholarship
In addition to articles, interviews and talks on education, and to scholarly books and articles, particularly in Latin literature and Roman History, and publications in the field of Egyptology (while at Eton he was also curator of the Myers Museum of Ancient Egyptian Art),  Spurr is known as a translator of Italian, and was awarded a Times Literary translation prize in 1991.

References

Alumni of Corpus Christi College, Oxford
Schoolteachers from Kent
Living people
People from Sydney
Head Masters of Westminster School
Headmasters of Clifton College
University of Sydney alumni
People educated at The King's School, Canterbury
People educated at Sydney Grammar School
1953 births
Teachers at Eton College